Jonathan Strasser (June 3, 1946 – March 8, 2017) was an American professional musician, educator, teacher, and conductor.

Biography
Strasser was born and raised in New York City. He attended the High School of Music & Art. He then attended the Manhattan School of Music for violin studies.

He was a faculty member for over 30 years at Music & Art and his high school's successor, LaGuardia H.S. of Performing Arts. To address the needs of students in New York City without a music program at their school, he founded the InterSchool Orchestras of New York. He was also on faculty for the Manhattan School of Music pre-college division, for which he would remain on faculty for over 30 years as teacher and conductor of the MSM Precollege Philharmonic.

Strasser held the role of actor as “the conductor” of the High School of Performing Arts orchestra during its performance in the 1980 film Fame.

In the press, he was profiled in the New York Times.

Death
Strasser passed away from cancer at the age of 70.
He is buried at Sharon Gardens in Valhalla, New York. His legacy includes countless students who went on either to be musicians and music teachers themselves or were influenced and mentored to be dedicated to their chosen path in life, with music always being important.

References

1946 births
2017 deaths
American conductors (music)
American male conductors (music)
American violinists